Anokhi Kahaniyan ( lit. Amazing stories) is children's Urdu language magazine published from Karachi, Pakistan. Its editor is Mehboob Elahi Makhmoor.

Anokhi Kahaniyan is among the most popular children's magazines of Pakistan.

History and profile
The first issue of Anokhi Kahaniyan came out on 10 August 1991. The first three issues were jointly edited by Mustufa Hashmi, Rauf Aslam Araeen, Shahid Ali Sahar and Mehboob Elahi Makhmoor, Enam Ellahi. The editorship  was taken by Elahi Bax Chisti, Noor Muhammad Hashmi and Mehboob Elahi Makhmoor in December 1991. The magazine has been published and edited by Mehboob Elahi Makhmoor since 1991.

Anokhi Kahaniyan faced financial hardships during initial phase. The late Chisti, father of Makhmoor had a great financial contribution in the establishment of the magazine.

Many popular children's literature writers have been writing for Anokhi Kahaniyan. Naushad Adil is among those writers.

Awards
Anokhi Kahaniyan has been awarded with the Best Magazine award for four times by UNICEF Pakistan and International Islamic University, Islamabad. National Book Foundation has also awarded the founder and editor of the magazine with appreciation certificates and  price cash of Rs. 10,000 ($100) for three times. National textbook board approved the inclusion of Makhmoor's drafts in curriculum for three consecutive years.

See also
 List of Urdu magazines for children

References

External links
 Official website

1991 establishments in Pakistan
Magazines established in 1991
Mass media in Karachi
Monthly magazines published in Pakistan
Children's magazines published in Pakistan
Urdu-language magazines